Leston Laycock Havens (July 31, 1924July 29, 2011) was an American psychiatrist, psychotherapist and medical educator.

Dr. Havens is best known for his work on biological psychiatry, the rehabilitation of severely ill patients, and methods of interviewing patients..  He was also a pioneer in the establishment of hospital psychopharmacology units.

Early life
Havens was born on July 31, 1924 in Brooklyn, New York City, where he also grew up. His father was a lawyer, and Havens originally considered law as a career path before deciding on medicine. When he entered Williams College, in Williamstown, Massachusetts, he studied English and history, as well as philosophy. In 1944, during World War II, he joined the U.S. Army, serving until 1946. He was stationed on Tinian, a captured Japanese island in the Pacific, where he located and detonated abandoned ammunition. After his discharge from the military, Havens completed his B.A. magna cum laude, in 1947.

Academic life
Havens went on to attend Cornell Medical School, graduating with his M.D. in 1952.  He served as an intern in Internal Medicine at the New York Hospital and stayed there until 1954 as an assistant resident. Havens completed his residency from 1954 to 1958 at the Boston Psychopathic Hospital (now the Massachusetts Mental Health Center). This began a long connection with the Harvard University Medical School. In 1954, Havens was appointed as a Teaching Fellow in Psychiatry at Harvard and by 1971 was promoted to full professor status at Harvard Medical School.

While at Boston Psychopathic, Havens founded the Psychopharmacology Unit; one of the first in the country and one that would become famous. There he completed many studies on Electroconvulsive Therapy. Between 1964 and 1982 Havens directed the medical student clerkship at Boston Psychopathic.

From 1987 to 1996. Havens directed the psychiatry residency program at Cambridge Hospital, a teaching hospital of Harvard Medical School. At Cambridge he was a beloved teacher and mentor who influenced the development of many psychiatrists and psychologists. He was an iconoclast and great patient advocate, teaching his students to listen and relate to their patients and not merely to categorize or pathologize them.

Awards
Leston Havens received many awards throughout his career.

1952 Cornell University Medical School: Morton prize in Internal Medicine, Samuel prize in ophthalmology, Alpha Omega Alpha
1958 A.E. Bennett Award, Society of Biological Psychiatry
1962 McCurdy Prize, Massachusetts Society for Research in Psychiatry
1970 Fried Lecture, Newton-Wellesley Hospital
1973 Who's Who in America
1977 H.C. Solomon Award with Thomas G. Gutheil, M.D.
1979 Award for Excellence in Clinical Teaching, Harvard Medical School, plus numerous nominations
1979 Elvin Semrad Teaching Award, Massachusetts Mental Health Center
1981 Valentina Donahue-Turner Award for Teaching, Harvard Medical School
1986 Harry Stack Sullivan Lecture, The Sheppard and Enoch Pratt Hospital
1986 Honorable Bernard Towson-Lectureship in Psychiatry, Cornell North Shore Hospital
1989 Frieda Fromm Reichman Lecturer, Washington Psychiatric Society
1992 Price Lecture, Trinity Church, Boston, MA 
1995 Benjamin Rush Award and Lecture, American Psychiatric Association
1995 Nomination for 1995 Harvard Medical School Award for Excellence in Mentoring
1997 William F. Orr Lecture
1997 Zigmond Lebensohn Lecture
1998 Lee Hasenbush Lecture, MMHC
1998 Jacob Finesinger Lecture, University of Maryland
1999 Honorary Member, William Alanson White Institute, New York

Bibliography

Approaches to the Mind: Movement of the Psychiatric Schools From Sects Toward Science (1973 & 1987)
Participant Observation (1976, 1983, & 1993)
Making Contact: Uses of Language in Psychotherapy (1986)
A Safe Place: Laying the Groundwork of Psychotherapy (1989, 1991, & 1996)
Coming to Life (1993)
Learning to Be Human (1994)
The real World Guide to Psychotherapy Practice (2000) Written with Dr. Alex N. Sabo

External links 
 Leston L. Havens MD Teaching Site (archived website)

References

1924 births
2011 deaths
American psychiatrists
American psychotherapists
Weill Cornell Medical College alumni
Williams College alumni
United States Army personnel of World War II